Bahrin (also Romanized as Baḥrīn) is a village in Nehzatabad Rural District, in the Central District of Rudbar-e Jonubi County, Kerman Province, Iran. At the 2006 census, its population was 90, in 17 families.

References 

Populated places in Rudbar-e Jonubi County